RDG, or Rdg, may refer to:

 Rail Delivery Group, a body in the privatised British railway system
 RDG Red Data Girl, fantasy novel series by Noriko Ogiwara
 RDG, the AAR reporting mark for the Reading Company, a defunct US railroad
 RDG, the IATA code for Reading Regional Airport in the state of Pennsylvania, US
 RDG, the National Rail code for Reading railway station in the county of Berkshire, UK
 Reading, in the field of temperature measurement
 Rechtsdienstleistungsgesetz, the German Legal Services Act
 Revolutionary Democratic Group, socialist organisation in the United Kingdom
 Royal Dragoon Guards, the Royal Dragoon Guards is an armoured regiment of the British Army
 Rwanda Development Gateway, a project to set up a national Rwandan portal for information sharing

See also